The Miss Purwanchal pageant (also known as The Miss Eastern pageant) is a beauty pageant that started in 2010, for several eastern developmentmental regions in Nepal.  The regions are Sagarmatha, Koshi and Mechi. The pageant was formed to bring the communities together to reflect on the culture, beauty, and traditions of rural Nepal.

The winner of the Miss Purwanchal pageant receives a direct entry into the national pageant, Miss Nepal, as a semi-finalist. The 2019 title holder for Miss Purwanachal is Riju Bhattarai of Pathari Shanischare, Morang District.

Representative to Miss Nepal from Eastern Nepal
Color key
  Declared as Winner
  Ended as Runner-up
  Ended as one of the top Semi-Finalists

Before 2010, Miss Eastanchal used to send one or two delegates representing eastern Nepal.

Miss Purwanchal 2017

Miss Purwanchal 2016

Placements

Special Awards

References

External links
Official site

 
Beauty pageants in Nepal
Nepalese awards
Miss Nepal regional pageants
Recurring events established in 2010
2010 establishments in Nepal